The 1977 New Orleans Saints season was the team's eleventh as a member of the National Football League. They were unable to improve on their previous season's output of 4–10, winning only three games. The most notable part of the season was when they lost to the Tampa Bay Buccaneers, who won their first game in franchise history after losing their first 26 games. The team failed to qualify for the playoffs for the eleventh consecutive season, while coach Hank Stram was fired following the season. In his two seasons as coach the Saints only won seven games.

Offseason

NFL draft

Personnel

Staff

Roster

Regular season 
The first victory overall for the Tampa Bay Buccaneers, did not come until week 13 on the road against the Saints, almost two seasons after their first game against the Houston Oilers in 1976. The Bucs led at halftime by a score of 13–0. Dave Green had two field goals, while Gary Huff threw a touchdown pass to Morris Owens. Upon their arrival in Tampa Bay, the Bucs were greeted by 8,000 fans.

The Saints were 11-point favorites before the game, and fans booed as the Buccaneers scored. "Eleven years I've supported this franchise!" one shouted, adding, "With all this money I've spent on this lousy team I could have bought some land in Colombia and raised pot." Losing to a team with a 0–26 losing streak was so humiliating that safety Tom Myers said, "We've been made the laughingstocks of the business ... I'm too embarrassed to say that I play for the team that got beat by Tampa Bay." Said head coach Hank Stram, "We're all very ashamed of what happened today. Ashamed for our people, for our fans, the organization, everybody. It is my worst coaching experience." Team owner John Mecom said during the loss that the Saints "is a poorly coached team", and Stram was fired January 28, 1978.

Schedule

Week 10 vs. Atlanta Falcons 
TV Network: CBS
Announcers: Gary Bender, Johnny Unitas
Before a Regional TV Audience, Atlanta, which had never given up more than 14 points in a game this year, tried to keep it that way with one minute to go - In New Orleans - And Archie Manning was waiting. The Saints quarterback, back in action for the first time in six weeks, read the blitz and beat it with a 18-yard TD Pass, his second scoring strike to tight end Henry Childs. It was Hank Stram's 136th victory as a head coach... and his last.

Standings

Notes

References 

New Orleans Saints seasons
New Orleans Saints
New Orl